Football is the  number one sport based on participation, but the third sport in Latvia after ice hockey and basketball based on popularity. Many other sports are also more popular than football in Latvia, but in recent years it has gained more popularity. The Latvian Football Federation is the sport's national governing body. There is a league system, with the Higher League and First League serving as the top leagues in Latvia. There is the Latvian Second League also, where mostly amateur teams play. There are also national cup competitions, with the Latvian Cup being the most notable.

History
The Latvian Football Federation was founded in 1921. In 1922 The Latvian Football Federation  joined FIFA. In 1940-1991, Latvia was part of the USSR and as an independent state did not take part in the World Cup and European championships. After gaining independence in 1992, membership was restored.

Domestic Football
Skonto FC were the most popular and successful football team in Latvia and have won the Latvian Higher League 14 times since independence from Russia. Latvian football is rife with corruption and bribery. FK Ventspils is the only team from Latvia which has played in the group stage of the UEFA Europe League (2009–10). No Latvian team has ever reached the group stage of the UEFA Champions League.

League system

The table below illustrates the comprehensive structure of Latvian league football.

Note: Exact numbers of clubs at every level of the league system, particularly those at lower levels, are subject to change and are current as of the 2022 season.

National team

The Latvia national football team in 2003 qualified to Euro 2004. This resulted in being the first and currently only Baltic national team to do so.

See also

National teams
 Latvia national football team 
 Latvia national under-21 football team
 Latvia national under-19 football team 
 Latvia national under-17 football team

Women's teams
 Latvia women's national football team

Competitions

Leagues
 Latvian Higher League
 Latvian First League
 Latvian Second League

Women's leagues
 Latvian Women's League

Cups
 Latvian Football Cup
 Latvian Supercup

Clubs

See also
Alberts Tarulis

Notes

References

External links
 League321.com - Latvian football league tables, records & statistics database